The Definitive Alice Cooper is a compilation album by Alice Cooper, released in 2001 on Rhino Records. It is the international counterpart of Mascara & Monsters: The Best of Alice Cooper, with a slightly different track listing and a different cover. The album was released worldwide except in the United States.

Track listing

References

Alice Cooper compilation albums
2001 compilation albums
Rhino Records compilation albums